Sextet (Istanbul) 1996 is a live album by composer and saxophonist Anthony Braxton with an sextet, recorded at the AkBank Jazz Festival in Turkey in 1995 and released on his own Braxton House label.

Reception

The Allmusic review by Thom Jurek stated "Of the Braxton House recordings, the Sextet (Istanbul, 1996) issue is the best of the instrumental recordings released by the label. Recorded at the Akbank Jazz Festival in October of 1995, the sextet Braxton employs to perform the first compositions in his Ghost Trance Musics series is made of veteran improvisers rather than students ... Make no mistake, this ensemble isn't nearly as capable of careening through Braxton's music as the classic quartet was, but they don't have to be because this music is far more structured and doesn't lend itself as much to individual improvisational voice or to fiery pyrotechnics. Instead the sextet is a unit that relies of nuance and the trace elements in the composition that lend themselves to acts of surprise and spontaneity".

Track listing
All compositions by Anthony Braxton

Disc one
 "Composition No. 185" – 38:31
 "Composition No. 186" – 19:09 	
Disc two
 "Composition No. 186 (Continued)" – 40:17

Personnel
 Anthony Braxton –  flute, clarinet, contrabass clarinet, sopranino saxophone, alto saxophone
Roland Dahinden – trombone, alto trombone
Jason Kao Hwang – electric violin
Ted Reichman – accordion
 Joe Fonda – bass 
Kevin Norton – drums, vibraphone, glockenspiel, percussion

References

Anthony Braxton live albums
1996 live albums